Lale Devri is a Turkish television drama series, originally aired on Show TV and FOX from 2010 to 2014.

Cast
 Tolgahan Sayışman as Çınar Ilgaz	
 Selen Soyder as Toprak Ilgaz
 Emina Jahović Sandal as Lale Taşkıran Ilgaz		
 Serenay Sarıkaya as Yeşim Taşkıran	
 Kenan Bal as Necip Ilgaz
 Hatice Aslan as Zümrüt Taşkıran
 Gül Onat as Ikbal Ilgaz
 Aykut Yılmaz as Kerem Taşkıran
 Ayten Soykök as Reyhan Ilgaz
 Ayşegül Günay as Sultan Yesilyurt
 Şerif Sezer as Nedret Ilgaz	
 Selma Kutluğ as Şeref Karagül			
 Ulvi Alacakaptan as Remzi Karagül			
 Korel Cezayirli as Ahmet Çağın		
 Kıvanç Kılınç as Sıtkı Engin	
 Erdal Bilingen as Şefik	
 Hakan Pişkin as Ekrem	
 Gökhan Atalay as Mehmet		
 Açelya Elmas as Ece	
 Pamir Pekin as Cansel
 Ebru Nil Aydın as Nermin	
 Gözde Mutluer as Aslı	
 Gökhan Çetin as Medet		
 Eren Bucak as Tibet	
 Serdar Gökhan as Haluk Kırali
 Kadir Kandemir as Okan Bostanci
 Tolga Sala as Yiğit Yeşilyurt
 İpek Erdem as Münevver Hancıoğlu

Series overview

Cinar is a very wealthy businessman. He has great respect for his uncle, who is like a father figure to him.

Lale is a beautiful and good-natured girl. She finds out that her father's death is caused by her mother's infidelity. She has a younger sister and a younger brother. Her sister Yasmin also likes Cinar.

However, Cinar and Lale fall in love and get married soon. They have a daughter also named Lale. Soon after, Lale (mother) dies which leaves Cinar devastated. Yasmin who has been interested in Cinar before Lale's accident takes the opportunity to comfort Cinar and they sleep together. However, Cinar knows that this is wrong and needs to stay away from Yasmin.

Cinar goes to a friend's wedding and meets a beautiful but sad girl, Toprak, who is devastated over her love's interest marriage to her sister. Cinar finds solace in her and asks her to marry him as a marriage of convenience, which should help Cinar stay away from Yasmin and help Toprak heal her heart.

Toprak accepts the proposal and they start their platonic relationship. Yasmin is extremely jealous of Toprak and often reminds her of her poor background as well as her divorce.

Yasmin gets pregnant with Cinar's child. She decides to keep the baby despite everyone's disapproval. The baby is born but has a unique medical issue that can only be solved by the bone marrow of a sibling. Lale's bone marrow does not match.

Cinar and Toprak eventually fall in love, but Yasmin will do all in her power to sabotage their relationship.  She finds Toprak's ex-husband and bribes him with money, so that together they can set up a trap for Toprak.  Meanwhile Toprak gets pregnant, but Yasmin manages to put a doubt in who the father is. Circumstances put Toprak in jail, and she ends up leaving Cinar. She goes to a family who accept her and a boy in the family, Ahmet, wants to marry her.

Cinar is now lost without Toprak and tries to reconcile with her.  Toprak divorces Cinar and hides her pregnancy from him.  She makes Cinar think she got an abortion. Even though they still love each other, Toprak tries to move on and to keep Cinar away marries Ahmet.  With pressure from the family Cinar marries Yasmin, even though he is madly in love with Toprak and is at a loss.  Even though he is married, Yasmin thinks she has won, but Cinar refuses to even touch her. When he finally decides that he has completely lost Toprak and will have no other choice but try to make a life with Yasmin, Sitki shows up at Cinar's office with a recording that will change everything.

International broadcasters

Awards

See also
Television in Turkey
List of Turkish television series
Turkish television drama

References

External links 
 
 
 Lale Devri  BeyazPerde.com 
 Lale Devri Sinematurk.com 
 Lale Devri sinemalar.com

2010 Turkish television series debuts
Turkish drama television series
2014 Turkish television series endings
Fox (Turkish TV channel) original programming
Show TV original programming
Hum TV original programming
Television shows set in Istanbul
Television series produced in Istanbul
Television series set in the 2010s